Cee Cee Chapman (born Melissa Carol Chapman on December 13, 1958 in Portsmouth, Virginia) is an American country music singer-songwriter. Chapman was signed to Curb Records. She charted five singles on the Billboard Hot Country Singles & Tracks chart.

Chapman was nominated for Top New Female Vocalist at the 1988 Academy of Country Music Awards. She was also nominated for Favorite Country New Artist at the American Music Awards of 1990.

Jack Hurst of the Chicago Tribune gave Chapman's eponymous second album three stars out of four, calling her a "straight-ahead singer" who "attacks almost any kind of song here with obvious personal involvement that is often stunning." The album also received a favorable review from People, which stated that it was "characterized by intelligent song selection" and that Chapman "at times [sounds] like Cher gone down-home."

Discography

Albums

Singles

Music videos

References

1958 births
American women country singers
American country singer-songwriters
Living people
Country musicians from Virginia
Musicians from Portsmouth, Virginia
Curb Records artists
Capitol Records artists
Singer-songwriters from Virginia
20th-century American singers
20th-century American women singers
21st-century American women